The Suzhou University of Science and Technology (SUST; ; informally 苏科大), is a public university co-construct by the Ministry of Housing and Urban-Rural Development and the People's Government of Jiangsu Province. Located in the Suzhou High & Technology Development Zone, Jiangsu, China.

SUST was established on 1 September 2001 by merging the former Suzhou Institute of Urban Construction and Environmental Protection and the former Suzhou Railway Teachers' College, which is a full-time general university mainly in engineering, with coordinated development of engineering, science, literature, administration and arts. There are three campuses: Shihu, Jiangfeng and Tianping.

References

External links 
  

2001 establishments in China
Educational institutions established in 2001
Technical universities and colleges in China
Universities and colleges in Suzhou